Nduduzo Makhathini (born 24 September 1982) is a South African jazz musician from Umgungundlovu, Pietermaritzburg, South Africa.

Coming from a musical family, his love for music began at an early age. Makhathini has performed with Zim Ngqawana, Simphiwe Dana, Feya Faku, and McCoy Mrubata. Nduduzo completed his Diploma in Jazz Piano at Durban University of Technology in 2005.

In April 2020, his studio album Modes of Communication: Letters from the Underworld was released.

Awards and honors
Makhathini is the recipient of the 2015 Standard Bank Young Artist Award in the category of Jazz. This is part of the National Arts Festival. At the 2017 All Africa Music Awards, Makhathini won the Best Jazz Artist award. His musical output has led him to be described by Seton Hawkins of All About Jazz to be "a truly singular pianist, an astonishingly gifted composer, and a deeply nuanced thinker on the music...one of the [South Africa]'s most remarkable talents."

Discography and downloads 
 Mother Tongue (Gundu, 2014) with Sakhile Simani, Mthunzi Mvubu, Linda Sikhakhane, Ariel Zamonsky, Benjamin Jeptha, Ayanda Sikade
 Sketches of Tomorrow (Gundu, 2014) with Sakhile Simani, Mthunzi Mvubu, Jonathan Crossley, Ayanda Sikade
 Listening to the Ground (Gundu, 2015)
 Matunda Ya Kwanza, Vol One (Gundu, 2015)
 Icilongo – The African Peace Suite (Gundu, 2016) with Sakhile Moleshe, Justin Bellairs, Shabaka Hutchings, Benjamin Jeptha, Ayanda Sikade
 Inner Dimensions - Umgidi Trio & One Voice Vocal Ensemble  (2016) with Fabien Iannone, Dominic Egli, Lisette Spinnler, Jule Fahrer
 Ikhambi (Universal South Africa, 2016)
 Reflections (Gundu, 2017)  - solo piano  
 Modes Of Communication: Letters From The Underworlds (Blue Note, 2020)
 The Blues Of A Zulu Spirit (EP, 2021)
 In The Spirit Of Ntu (Blue Note Africa, 2022)

References

External links
 
 
 
 

People from Pietermaritzburg
1982 births
Living people
South African jazz pianists
Blue Note Records artists
Universal Records artists
Durban University of Technology alumni